Courtney Nagle (born September 29, 1982) is a former American professional tennis player. Her career high doubles ranking is No. 97, set on April 20, 2009. Her career high WTA singles ranking is No. 541, which she reached on August 6, 2007. Nagle retired from professional tennis 2012.

ITF finals

Singles: 1 (0–1)

Doubles: 30 (15-15)

External links
 
 
 ITF news release for Nagle's doping offence

1982 births
Living people
American female tennis players
American sportspeople in doping cases
Doping cases in tennis
21st-century American women